Francisco Javier Cerezo Perales (born 1971), known as Francisco Cerezo for short, is a Spanish former professional road bicycle racer.

Career
He rode at the Danish professional cycling team of CSC-Tiscali, which he joined in 2001 from the Spanish team Vitalicio Seguros. He left the team in 2002 to join the Spanish team Cafés Baqué. In the 2000 Vuelta a España he was involved in a heated argument, which turned violent, with Mario Cipollini resulting in Cipollini being kicked from the race and Cerezo needing three stitches in his face.

Major results
Source:
1989
 3rd Junior Time trial Championships
1992
 4th Subida al Naranco
1993
 1st Stage 1 Volta ao Alentejo
1994
 1st Overall Grande Prémio Jornal de Notícias
1998
 2nd Trofeo Luis Ocana
1999
 2nd National Road race Championships
 6th Memorial Manuel Galera

Grand Tour general classification results timeline

References

External links
 
Trap-Friis profile (source)
Photo: http://www.louison.dds.nl/Cerezo.jpg

1971 births
Living people
Spanish male cyclists
Sportspeople from the Province of Ciudad Real
Cyclists from Castilla-La Mancha